KPVW (107.1 FM) is a radio station broadcasting a Mexican Regional format. It is licensed to Aspen, Colorado, United States, and serves the Aspen area.  The station is owned by Entravision Holdings.

External links
radioaspen 107.1 facebook

PVW
Entravision Communications stations